Zyrianin may refer to:

 The Komi peoples
 , a Soviet cargo ship secured from the United States via Lend-Lease; the former Dakotan (built 1912); in service with United States Army, United States Navy during World War I